Lauren Records is an American independent record label founded in Southern California in 2011. The label mostly specializes in indie rock, emo, and other melodic punk rock adjacent genres.

History

After a few years booking shows and tours for local bands, Lauren Records was formed.

The first release was a compilation LP called I Think We Should Stay Away From Each Other featuring groups like AJJ, Japanther and Joyce Manor. Initially supposed to be a home duplicated cassette with just local friends’ bands, as more bands expressed interest in putting a song on, it went from almost being a CD to just being an LP.

As of 2017 the label was still a one person endeavour.

Artists released by Lauren
Adult Mom
Antonioni
AJJ
Algernon Cadwallader
The Bananas
Benny The Jet Rodriguez
Blowout
Closer
Colour Me Wednesday
Dogbreth
Diners
Fishboy
Glocca Morra
Guppy
Hard Girls
Hot Tang
Japanther
Joyce Manor
Joyride!
Katie Ellen
Leer
Peach Kelli Pop
Pens+
Real Life Buildings
Saoirse Dream
Shinobu
Signals Midwest
Spoonboy
Summer Vacation
together PANGEA
The Total Bettys
Upset
Walter, etc.
Walter Mitty and His Makeshift Orchestra
Winter Break

References

Alternative rock record labels
Punk record labels
Indie rock record labels
American independent record labels
Record labels established in 2011
2011 establishments in California